"Driftwood" is a 1978 single by the English progressive rock band the Moody Blues. It was the second single released from the album Octave, after "Steppin' in a Slide Zone". Written by Justin Hayward, "Driftwood" is a slow love ballad, in a similar manner to "Nights in White Satin" and "Never Comes the Day."

Background
Billboard described "Driftwood" as a "lush romantic ballad."  Cash Box called it "a smooth and spacy ballad about beaching on the shore of life" and also praised the vocal performance.

"Driftwood" was also the final single to feature keyboardist Mike Pinder, who left the band shortly before the completion of Octave for personal reasons. He would later be replaced by former Yes keyboardist Patrick Moraz.

Shortly after release, a promotional video was recorded for "Driftwood." The video features Patrick Moraz on the keyboards, although Mike Pinder is playing the keyboards in the actual recording. The song also includes an alto saxophone which is played by session musician R.A. Martin, although Ray Thomas is depicted playing the alto saxophone in the video.

Personnel
 Justin Hayward: vocals, acoustic guitar, electric guitar
 John Lodge: bass guitar
 Mike Pinder: keyboards
 Ray Thomas: tambourine
 Graeme Edge: drums, percussion

Additional personnel
 R.A. Martin: horns, alto saxophone

Chart success
The record spent seven weeks on the U.S. Billboard charts and peaked at No. 59.  It also reached No. 38 on the Adult Contemporary charts.

References

The Moody Blues songs
1978 singles
Songs written by Justin Hayward
1978 songs
Decca Records singles